Jeffrey Ross Gunter is an American dermatologist who served as the U.S. Ambassador to Iceland from 2019 to 2021.

Education 
Gunter graduated from Beverly Hills High School. He received his Bachelor of Arts in Psychology from the University of California, Berkeley in 1983, and his Doctor of Medicine degree from the USC School of Medicine in 1987.

Career 
Gunter is based in Lancaster, California, outside Los Angeles. His dermatology practice, GunterMD Dermatology, has offices in Lancaster as well as Texas, Nevada, and Arizona. He was a clinical professor of medicine at University of Southern California Keck School of Medicine and chief resident of dermatology at Los Angeles County+USC Medical Center.

Gunter is a Republican Party donor and a member of the board of directors of the Republican Jewish Coalition. In 2016, he donated $58,563 to several state Republican Party organizations, $33,400 to the Republican National Committee and $5,400 (the maximum contribution) to Donald Trump's presidential campaign. Gunter also gave $100,000 to the Trump Victory PAC and $100,000 to Trump's inaugural committee.

U.S. Ambassador to Iceland

Appointment
On August 21, 2018, Trump nominated Gunter to serve as U.S. Ambassador to Iceland; the Senate took no action on the nomination, which expired on January 3, 2019 at the end of the 115th Congress. Trump then renominated Gunter on January 16, 2019, at the outset of the 116th Congress; on May 23, 2019, following a hearing in the Senate Foreign Relations Committee, Gunter was confirmed by the Senate by voice vote. Gunter presented his credentials on July 2, 2019. He left office on January 20, 2021.

Gunter had never visited Iceland prior to his nomination to the ambassadorship.

Controversial tenure

In July 2020, CBS News reported, that, according to interviews with diplomats, officials, and persons familiar with the situation, Gunter was "paranoid" about his security in the Icelandic capital, Reykjavik, despite its status as one of the world's safest cities; Gunter asked the State Department to seek special permission from the Icelandic government for him to carry a gun, had requested to wear a "stab-proof vest" and have door-to-door armored car service. Three diplomatic sources interviewed by CBS News said that Gunter was persuaded not to arm himself because it would be perceived as insulting to Iceland; the embassy nevertheless placed an advertisement in the Icelandic press seeking full-time Icelandic bodyguards, which CBS News' sources described as a way to "placate Gunter's 'irrational' concerns."

According to those interviewed by CBS News, the work climate at the Embassy in Reykjavik was "untenable" under Gunter's leadership; in fewer than two years on the job, Gunter had already had seven deputy chiefs of mission (DCMs), the second-highest positions at the embassy, held by career foreign service officers. A State Department official told CBS that the first DCM spent months learning Icelandic, but was rejected by Gunter, reportedly because the ambassador "didn't like the look of him" at their first meeting. The second DCM spent only six months in Iceland, and was followed a series of short-term temporary DCMs, with whom Gunter reportedly clashed frequently. CBS News also reported that Gunter "accused others of various, unsubstantiated infractions, including trying to undermine him to Washington and being complicit with the 'deep state.'"

In February 2020, after taking personal leave after a conference in Washington, Gunter refused to return to his post in Reykjavik. The State Department attributed Gunter's delayed return to Iceland to the COVID-19 pandemic; however, "multiple sources in Washington, Reykjavik and elsewhere said Gunter wanted to work remotely from California and told senior officials he would not go back overseas unless expressly ordered to do so by Secretary of State Mike Pompeo." A series of senior State Department officials failed to persuade Gunter until Pompeo called him; Gunter returned to Iceland in May 2020. Gunter is controversial in Iceland, with many objecting to his description of COVID-19 as "the Invisible China Virus!" on Twitter.

In late October 2020, Icelandic newspaper Fréttablaðið reported that an employee of the embassy had contracted COVID-19. The article also discusses how the embassy decided to fast track its scheduled relocation despite the news. Gunter had reportedly made this decision to ensure that the move would be complete in time for the upcoming US presidential election.
Following the publication, the US embassy Facebook page posted a statement claiming the article was “irresponsible”, “shameful” and “fake news”. The statement mentions that the illness was with a local employee and that the embassy was “one of the safest havens from COVID-19 in Reykjavík”. The post incorrectly claimed that Iceland had one of the highest rates of COVID-19 infections in Europe.

An Department of State Office of Inspector General report published in October 2021 was highly critical of Gunter's tenure as ambassador. The report stated that under Gunter, the U.S.-Icelandic relationship "became so strained at one point ... that the then-Undersecretary for Political Affairs instructed the Bureau of European and Eurasian Affairs (EUR) to work directly with the Icelandic Ministry of Foreign Affairs." The report also found that Gunter had frequently failed "to respect diplomatic protocol or to coordinate with the Icelandic Government on policy initiatives and press statements touching on sensitive defense-related subjects," causing public controversy in Iceland, and that he "insisted on personally reviewing all contact with Icelandic Government officials and discouraged or restricted embassy officers from engaging with most Icelandic contacts." The OGI report found that Gunter had created a "threatening and intimidating environment": "For example, staff reported to OIG multiple instances in which the former Ambassador had threatened to sue Department officials and embassy staff who expressed disagreement with him, questioned his wishes, or were perceived to be 'disloyal' to him. In addition, many employees reported to OIG that the former Ambassador threatened reprisal against employees who communicated with Department officials in Washington while conducting their official duties."

References

Living people
American dermatologists
University of California, Berkeley alumni
Keck School of Medicine of USC alumni
21st-century American businesspeople
21st-century American diplomats
Ambassadors of the United States to Iceland
American company founders
American Jews
California Republicans
Keck School of Medicine of USC faculty
Year of birth missing (living people)